In the Philippines, crispy tadyang ng baka is deep-fried beef ribs that is served with a side of soy sauce and vinegar (toyo't suka) and/or pickled vegetables (atchara). The ribs are regarded as a pulutan, best served with beer. Crispy tadyang is similar to baby back ribs but made of beef and fried instead of grilled.

See also
 List of beef dishes
 List of deep fried foods

References

Philippine beef dishes
Beef dishes
Deep fried foods